68th National Board of Review Awards

Best Picture: 
 Shine 
The 68th National Board of Review Awards, honoring the best in filmmaking in 1996, were announced on 9 December 1996 and given on 9 February 1997.

Top 10 films
Shine
The English Patient 
Fargo
Secrets & Lies
Everyone Says I Love You
Evita
Sling Blade
Trainspotting
Breaking the Waves
Jerry Maguire

Top Foreign Films
Ridicule
Les Voleurs
Bitter Sugar
La Cérémonie
Kolya

Winners
Best Picture:
Shine
Best Foreign Language Film
Ridicule, France
Best Actor:
Tom Cruise - Jerry Maguire
Best Actress:
Frances McDormand - Fargo
Best Supporting Actor:
Edward Norton - Everyone Says I Love You
Best Supporting Actress (tie):
Juliette Binoche and Kristin Scott Thomas - The English Patient
Best Ensemble Acting:
The First Wives Club
Breakthrough performance:
Renée Zellweger - Jerry Maguire
Best Director:
Joel Coen - Fargo
Best Documentary:
Paradise Lost: The Child Murders at Robin Hood Hills
Best Film Made for Cable TV:
Wild Bill: Hollywood Maverick
Special Achievement in Filmmaking:
Billy Bob Thornton - Sling Blade
Special Citation:
Elia Kazan, for lifetime achievement in direction
Freedom of Expression Award:
The People vs. Larry Flynt - Miloš Forman, Oliver Stone
International Freedom Award:
Zhang Yuan
Billy Wilder Award:
Sidney Lumet
Career Achievement Award:
Gena Rowlands
William K. Everson Award for Film History:
Peter Bogdanovich, for Who the Devil Made It?
Special Recognition for Excellence in Filmmaking:
Angels & Insects
Basquiat
Big Night
Bound
Caught
Follow Me Home
I Shot Andy Warhol
Lone Star
Marvin's Room
The Substance of Fire
Swingers
The Deli
The War Room
Unhook the Stars
Welcome to the Dollhouse

External links
National Board of Review of Motion Pictures :: Awards for 1996

1996
1996 film awards
1996 in American cinema